Cynthia Yazmín Valdez Pérez (born December 11, 1987) is an individual Mexican rhythmic gymnast born in Guadalajara who has won 10 Pan American Games medals—two gold, four silver and four bronze medals.

Career 
She won a bronze medal in the 2003 Pan American Games, held in Santo Domingo, Dominican Republic, in the ribbon modality.

Cynthia Valdez won four medals in the 2007 Pan American Games held in Rio de Janeiro, Brazil, a silver medal in the all-around modality, and three bronze medals, in the clubs, rope and ribbon modalities.

She won five medals in the 2011 Pan American Games held in Guadalajara, Mexico, which were two gold medals and three silver medals. Cynthia Valdez won the gold medals in the hoop and in the club modalities, while she won the silver medals in the all-around, in the ball, and in the ribbon modalities. Cynthia Valdez was the only rhythmic gymnast to win a medal in each one of the individual competitions in the 2011 Pan American Games.

References

External links 
 
 
 
 
 Slideshow – Yahoo! Deportes.

1987 births
Living people
Gymnasts at the 2007 Pan American Games
Gymnasts at the 2011 Pan American Games
Sportspeople from Guadalajara, Jalisco
Mexican rhythmic gymnasts
Pan American Games gold medalists for Mexico
Pan American Games silver medalists for Mexico
Pan American Games bronze medalists for Mexico
Pan American Games medalists in gymnastics
Central American and Caribbean Games gold medalists for Mexico
Central American and Caribbean Games silver medalists for Mexico
Competitors at the 2006 Central American and Caribbean Games
Competitors at the 2014 Central American and Caribbean Games
Central American and Caribbean Games medalists in gymnastics
Medalists at the 2011 Pan American Games
21st-century Mexican women